The 2nd Annual Gotham Independent Film Awards, presented by the Independent Filmmaker Project, were held in 1992. At the ceremony hosted by Charles Grodin, Arthur B. Krim was honored with a Career Tribute with Spike Lee, D. A. Pennebaker, Susan Sarandon, Jay Presson Allen, Thelma Schoonmaker and Lindsay Law receiving the other individual awards.

Winners

Breakthrough Director (Open Palm Award)
 Tom Kalin – Swoon

Filmmaker Award
 Spike Lee
 D. A. Pennebaker

Actor Award
 Susan Sarandon

Writer Award
 Jay Presson Allen

Below-the-Line Award
 Thelma Schoonmaker, editor

Producer/Industry Executive Award
 Lindsay Law

Career Tribute
 Arthur B. Krim

References

External links
 

1992
1992 film awards